Adl-E-Jehangir (The Justice of Jehangir) also referred to as Adil-E-Jehangir, is a 1955 black and white Bollywood Hindi language historical drama film directed by G. P. Sippy. According to Sippy in an interview, it was the first film he directed, and it became a commercial success at the box office. The film had music composed by Husnlal Bhagatram, assisted by Shukla, with lyrics by Qamar Jalalabadi. A popular ghazal from the film was "Ae Meri Zindagi Tujhe Dhundhoon Kahan" sung by Talat Mahmood. The film starred Pradeep Kumar, Meena Kumari, Durga Khote, Sapru and Jankidas. Darpan, a leading Pakistani actor, also performed in the movie. He played the role of Prince Khurram (Shah Jahan).

The story involved a quasi-historical episode from Emperor Jehangir's reign where his sense of justice is brought into question when his wife, the Empress Noor Jehan is implicated by Rami, a washer woman, in the killing of her husband.

Plot
Emperor Jehangir is known all over India for his sense of justice, and loved by the public for that. Empress Noor Jehan goes on a hunt and accidentally shoots dead a washer man with her arrow. His widow, Rami Dhoban, comes to the palace and rings the bell of justice. When Jehangir learns that Rami demands his justice of "a life for a life", he puts himself forward to be killed by Rami. Eventually the episode is sorted out through his ministers, with Rami forgiving the Empress and her husband.

Cast
 Pradeep Kumar as Shiraz
 Meena Kumari as Zareena
 D. K. Sapru as Jehangir
 Durga Khote as Malika-E-Jehangir
 Darpan as Prince Khurram (Shah Jahan)

Soundtrack
The music direction was by Husnlal Bhagatram, who used the voices of Lata Mangeshkar and Talat Mahmood as playback singers for the songs. The lyricist was Qamar Jalalabadi. Talat's songs were picturised on Pradeep Kumar, with Lata giving the vocals for Meena Kumari. One of the songs was sung by Asha Bhosle.

Song list

Reception
As reported by G. P. Sippy in an interview, Adl-e-Jehangir, his directorial debut, was successful in "terms of money", "It brought us more than we had spent on it".

References

External links
 Adl-E-Jehangir at the Internet Movie Database

1955 films
Films scored by Husnlal Bhagatram
1950s Hindi-language films
Films set in the Mughal Empire
Indian historical drama films
History of India on film
Indian epic films
Cultural depictions of Jahangir
1950s historical drama films
Hindi-language drama films
Indian black-and-white films